Camp Archbald is a Girl Scout camp in Brooklyn Township, Susquehanna County, Pennsylvania. It encompasses , including a  lake (Lake Ely).  Established in 1920, it is the second oldest Girl Scout camp in America. (Only Camp Bonnie Brae in Massachusetts has been serving girls longer.) Camp Archbald falls under the jurisdiction of Girl Scouts in the Heart of Pennsylvania, which operates 7 camp facilities in Northeastern and Central. Pennsylvania.

See also

 Scouting in Pennsylvania

References

External links

 

Buildings and structures in Susquehanna County, Pennsylvania
Archbald
Archbald